Jackson County Courthouse is an Art Deco building in Medford, Oregon, United States that was built in 1932, six years after county residents voted to move the county seat from Jacksonville to Medford.

The former Jackson County Courthouse, built in Jacksonville, Oregon in 1883, once served as the Southern Oregon Historical Society Museum. It is a contributing property of the Jacksonville Historic District.

See also
National Register of Historic Places listings in Jackson County, Oregon

References

External links
Jackson County History from the Oregon State Archives

National Register of Historic Places in Jackson County, Oregon
Buildings and structures in Medford, Oregon
County courthouses in Oregon
Government buildings completed in 1932
Art Deco architecture in Oregon
1932 establishments in Oregon